Sangaste Parish was a rural municipality of the Estonian county of Valga with a population of 1,464 (as of 1 January 2010) and an area of 144.72 km².

Sangaste features attractions includes the Sangaste Castle, where Friedrich Wilhelm Rembert von Berg (1793-1874), the Governor-General of Finland (1855-1861), was born. It has a hotel and a restaurant. Sangaste is also the birthplace of the Estonian writer August Gailit (1891-1960) and Estonian opera singer Aarne Viisimaa (1898-1989).

The village was first mentioned in 1272 as Toyvel.

The mayor of Sangaste Parish is Kaido Tamberg from the Social Democratic Party.

Settlements
Small borough
Sangaste
Villages
Ädu - Keeni - Kurevere - Lauküla - Lossiküla - Mäeküla - Mägiste - Pringi - Restu - Risttee - Sarapuu - Tiidu - Vaalu

References

External links
Official Website 
Sangaste Castle